He Tian or Hetian may refer to:

Places
 Hotan (aka He Tian, Hetian), Hotan County, Hotan Prefecture, Xinjiang, China
 Hotan County (aka He Tian, Hetian), Hotan Prefecture, Xinjiang, China
 Hotan Prefecture (aka He Tian, Hetian), Xinjiang, China

People
 Duke Tai of Tian Qi (died 384 BC), personal name Tian He (He TIAN), ruler of Qi during the Warring States period
 Tang He Tian (born 1975; He Tian TANG or Hetian TANG), badminton player

Other uses
 HE Tian, a fictional character from Unruly Qiao

See also

 
 
 Tian He (disambiguation)
 Tian (disambiguation)
 He (disambiguation)